The 1938 Far Eastern Games were scheduled to be held in Osaka, Japan, although they were cancelled due to the outbreak of Second Sino-Japanese War. After the cancellation of these 1938 Games the Far Eastern Games ceased to exist and they have been replaced by the Asian Games after World War II.

References

Far Eastern Games
Events cancelled due to World War II
1938 in Asian sport
1938 in Japanese sport
Far Eastern Championship Games
Cancelled multi-sport events